In Greek mythology, Lilaea or Lilaia (Ancient Greek: Λίλαια) may refer to two different women:

 Lilaea, a Naiad of a spring of the same name. She was the daughter of the river god Cephissus. The ancient polis of Lilaea, and the modern village of Lilaia in Phocis, and the asteroid 213 Lilaea are named after her.
 Lilaia, a maenad named in a vase painting.

Notes

References 

 The Homeric Hymns and Homerica with an English Translation by Hugh G. Evelyn-White. Homeric Hymns. Cambridge, MA.,Harvard University Press; London, William Heinemann Ltd. 1914. Online version at the Perseus Digital Library. Greek text available from the same website.
 Pausanias, Description of Greece with an English Translation by W.H.S. Jones, Litt.D., and H.A. Ormerod, M.A., in 4 Volumes. Cambridge, MA, Harvard University Press; London, William Heinemann Ltd. 1918. . Online version at the Perseus Digital Library
 Pausanias, Graeciae Descriptio. 3 vols. Leipzig, Teubner. 1903.  Greek text available at the Perseus Digital Library.

Naiads
Maenads
Companions of Dionysus
Children of Potamoi
Phocian characters in Greek mythology